Annychka is a 1968 Ukrainian drama. The film, which was produced at the Dovzhenko Film Studios, takes place in 1943 and is about a Hutsul girl played by Lyubov Rumyantseva. In 1969, it received a Golden Tower award at the Phnom Penh Film Festival in Cambodia. The director received a special prize at the Kyiv Film Festival. In the USSR alone, in 1969 25.1 million people saw it.

Synopsis 
The film dwells of the love story in the midst of the Second World War in 1943. A Hutsul girl Annychka finds herself in the middle of hostilities and gets acquainted with a wounded soldier in the forest. Looking after the soldier, she falls in love with him and turns against her boyfriend in the village, who became a Nazi collaborator. Having told her father of the decision to elope with the soldier she drives her father to despair and eventual insanity. The story ends on a tragic note, when the father kills his daughter.

Cast
Lyubov Rumyantseva as Annychka, Anna Kmet, daughter of pan Kmet
Grigore Grigoriu as Andrei, wounded Red Army soldier from Central Ukraine
Konstantin Stepankov as pan Kmet, wealthy Hutsul
Ivan Mykolaichuk as Roman Derych, Annychka's groom, young Hutsul, who becomes a German Hilfspolizei and guard in a detention center for prisoners of war
Boryslav Brondukov as Krupyak, he is also pan Krupenko, chief Hilfspolizei officer
Anatoly Barchuk as Yaroslav, pan Kmytiv's farmhand
Ivan Havrilyuk as Yvanko, young Hutsul, Roman's friend, partisan sympathizer, whom the Hilfspolizei with the fascists made dance on broken glass and then shot
Olga Nozhkyna as Maria, Annychka's mother
Vasyl Symchych as Semyon, pan Kmet's farmhand
Fedir Stryhun as Fyodor, partisan
Vitaly Rozstalny as Viktor, partisan
Nynel Zhukovskaya as Seraphima, priest's daughter
Viktor Stepanenko as Viktor, Soviet prisoner
Viktor Miroshnichenko as village headman

See also 
Propala Hramota (1972) — other work of Borys Ivchenko

References 
Annychka at the Internet Movie Database
Annychka the movie. 1968
Annychka (1968) — New York Times movies

External links 
 

Dovzhenko Film Studios films
1968 films
Soviet-era Ukrainian films
Ukrainian-language films
Films set in 1943
Soviet black-and-white films
Ukrainian black-and-white films
Eastern Front of World War II films
Soviet World War II films
Ukrainian World War II films